Brniště is a municipality and village in Česká Lípa District in the Liberec Region of the Czech Republic. It has about 1,400 inhabitants.

Administrative parts
Villages of Hlemýždí, Jáchymov, Luhov, Nový Luhov and Velký Grunov are administrative parts of Brniště.

References

Villages in Česká Lípa District